Steaua Stadium, informally also known as Ghencea, was a football stadium in Bucharest, Romania, which served as the home of Steaua București. It was inaugurated on 9 April 1974 when Steaua played a friendly game against OFK Belgrade, 2–2. Gheorghe Tătaru was the first player to score in the stadium.

The stadium was entirely demolished in 2018, and was replaced with a new all-seater stadium opened in 2021.

History 
At the time it was one of the first football-only stadiums ever built in Romania, as there are no athletic (track and field) facilities, and the stands are very close to the pitch.

The original capacity was 30,000 on benches, but in 1991 when the plastic seats were installed, the capacity dropped to 28,365, along with 126 press seats, 440 seats in VIP boxes and 733 armchairs. The floodlighting system with a density of 1400 lux was inaugurated in 1991.

The stadium was renovated in 1996 and 2006 in order to host UEFA Champions League. It was renovated again in 2020 for €94.7 million in a project that brought its seating capacity to 31.254.

Romania national football team
The following national team matches were held in the stadium:

Important matches

Photo gallery

See also

List of football stadiums in Romania

References

External links
Official website 
Stadium Guide images

FC Steaua București
Football venues in Romania
Buildings and structures in Bucharest
Sports venues in Bucharest
Defunct football venues in Romania
Sports venues completed in 1974
1974 establishments in Romania